Otto I, Count of Scheyern-Dachau-Valley (also known as Otto of Dachau-Valley; died after 5 November 1130) was a German nobleman.  He was a son of Count Arnold I of Scheyern and his wife, Beatrix of Reipersberg.  Otto I was the founder of the Scheyern-Dachau-Valley line.

Life 
He acquired the town of Grub via his wife.  In 1122, he founded the town of Bernried am Starnberger See and became its vogt.  In 1124, he acquired Dachau and the County of Valley (Valley, Bavaria).  The branch of the House of Wittelsbach which descended from him, was named after these possessions.

Marriage and issue 
Otto married Adelaide of Weilheim.  Together, they had five children:
 Gebhard (d. 1141)
 Conrad I (d. 1175)
 Adelaide, married Count Engelbert II of Gorizia
 Otto II (d. )
 Matilda

References 

 Slides including a family tree of the Counts of Scheyern-Dachau-Valley from a presentation by prof. Schmid Bayern im Spätmittelalter, WS 1996/97

External links 
 Entry at genealogie-mittelalter

House of Wittelsbach
Counts of Germany
Year of birth unknown
12th-century deaths
Year of death unknown
12th-century German nobility